Shefali Chowdhury (born 22 June 1988) is a  British actress best known for playing the role of Parvati Patil in the Harry Potter film series, except for Harry Potter and the Prisoner of Azkaban (2004), in which the character is played by Sitara Shah.

Early life
The youngest of five siblings, Chowdhury was born in Denbigh, Wales, to Bangladeshi parents from Sylhet who migrated to the United Kingdom in 1980. At the age of six, she moved to Birmingham, England.

Career
Chowdhury is known for her performances as Parvati Patil in three of the Harry Potter films, starting with 2005's Harry Potter and the Goblet of Fire. She acquired the role when she was in her last year at the Waverley School in Birmingham. She and Afshan Azad, who played the character of Chowdhury's twin sister Padma Patil, are also good friends, according to Azad.

Filmography

See also

 British Bangladeshi
 List of British Bangladeshis
 List of Harry Potter cast members

References

External links
 
 I Am The Doorway Rowney Brothers Site

1988 births
Living people
21st-century British actresses
Actresses from Birmingham, West Midlands
Alumni of Birmingham City University
British actresses of South Asian descent
British child actresses
British film actresses
British people of Bangladeshi descent
People from Denbigh
People from Sylhet Division
21st-century English women
21st-century English people